is a town located in Koyu District, Miyazaki Prefecture, Japan.

As of October 1, 2019, the town has an estimated population of 15,372 and the density of 171 persons per km². The total area is 90.12 km².

Transportation

Railway 

 JR Kyushu - Nippō Main Line
 Kawaminami Station

Highways 

 Higashikyushu Expressway
 Japan National Route 10

References

External links

Kawaminami official website 

Towns in Miyazaki Prefecture